Dugès is a surname. Notable people with the surname include:

Antoine Louis Dugès (1797–1838), French obstetrician and naturalist
Alfredo Dugès (1826–1910), French-born Mexican physician and naturalist, son of Antoine
Marie Jonet Dugès (1730–1797), French midwife